List of important political and civil figures during World War II:
Emperor Hirohito: Emperor of Japan
Osachi Hamaguchi: Prime Minister
Tomeo Sagoya: the assassin of Prime Minister Osachi Hamaguchi. He was a member of Aikokusha (Love of Country Association)
Wakatsuki Reijirō: Prime Minister
Hara Takashi: Commoner and liberal thinker of the Seiyukai party, came to be Prime Minister
Kaku Mori: a Parliamentary Vice-Minister of Foreign Affairs
Yōsuke Matsuoka: Foreign Affairs Minister
Fumimaro Konoe: Prime Minister, founder of Dobunkai Secret society 
Naotake Satō: himself realizing official duties, Manchukuo and China, some ambassador in Italy and last Ambassador in Soviet Union
Kanji Kato: an important functionary in the Foreign affairs ministry
Gotō Shinpei: ex-governor of Taiwan and important supporter of Manchukuo actions
Noburo Ohtani: president of N.Y.K. Line
Kishi Shinsuke: a nationalist, industrialist and merchant
Yakichiro Suma: Spokesman of Foreign Affairs Ministry
Nobofumi Ito: Chief of Information department
Koh Ishii: Spokesman of Information department
Saitō Takao: Member of Diet, opposed to official policy
Baron Takumo Dan: Chief of Mitsui Banking interest and United States friend
Kazuo Taoka: nationalist and head of the Yamaguchi-gumi, the largest yakuza syndicate.
Kenji Osano: Ultranationalist politician and kuromaku.
Kōki Hirota: member of Genyosha and Black Dragon secret societies, also Foreign Minister, Prime Minister
Kaoru Ogawa: another member of nationalist societies and right wing believer associated with organized crime
Ryōhei Uchida: Ultranationalist, founder of Genyosha (Dark Ocean, also Black Ocean) secret society; too right-wing adviser and president of Dai Nippon Seisanto (Japan Production Party) nationalist party.
Kuzuo Yoshihisa: Right-wing supporter, successor of Ryohei Uchida in leading of Black Dragon Society in 1937.
Kotaro Hiraoka: another ultranationalist, also a Samurai. Another founder of the Genyosha Secret society.
Mitsuro Toyama: chief of Black Dragon Society, also founder of Kenkokukai and Roninkai secret groups. 
Kosaburo Tachibana: right-wing follower, founder of Aikyojuku (Native-Land-Loving School) Secret society 
Kakuei Tanaka: Ultranationalist. Former Japanese Prime Minister
Hisayuki Machii: Ethnic Korean and boss of Toa-kai
Kakuji Inagawa: another right-wing follower and boss of Inagawa-kai yakuza syndicate.
Fumio Gotō: chief of Showa Studies Society
Dr. Shūmei Ōkawa: nationalist ideologist and instructor in Showa Studies Society
Count Yoriyasu Arima: another "professor" in Showa Studies Society
Fusanosuke Kuhara: ex-syndicalist, ideologist and right-wing spokesman
Komakichi Matsuoka: syndicalist and leader of the Worker Federation of Japan industrial Syndicate during the 1940s
Naoki Hoshino: right-wing and Army civil follower Ideologist
Ichizō Kobayashi: President of Tokio Gasu Denky (Electric light and Gas Company of Tokyo) and Minister of Commerce and Industry
Shōzō Murata: president of Osaka Shosen Kaisha, Minister of Communications
Prince Saionji Kinmochi: last survivor of ancient Genro group, related with Sumitomo Zaibatsu Clan
Akira Kazami: Ministry of Justice
Baron Hiranuma Kiichirō: Radical thinker, Home Minister
Masatsune Ogura: Director of Sumitomo Empress and Finance Minister
Chikao Fujisawa: member of Diet, supporte of State Shinto laws
Prince Kan'in Kotohito, supporter of State 
Katsuko Tojo: Tojo's wife and supporter of the implementation of eugenics policies in Japan
Yoshisuke Aikawa: Industrialist of Nissan Company, also Chief of Manchukuo Industrial Zaibatsu along Japanese Army Establishment
Toshio Shiratori: radical follower of the Axis Powers alliance, first adviser of the Foreign Affairs ministry and ambassador in Italy
Count Kabayama: moderate and Capitalist diplomat, also United States friend
Renzo Sawada: ex-ambassador in France
Juji Kasai:  Representative Chamber Member, another Pro-American
Kensuke Horinouchi: Ambassador in the United States for a short time
Marquis Okuma: ex-Prime Minister
Fuji Fujuzawa: Industrialist and foreign merchant in Scrap iron and nationalist government supporter
Saburō Kurusu: new special ambassador in the United States
Kaname Wakasugi: aide of Special Ambassador
Yoshio Kodama: ultranationalist thinker and political personality related with Yakuza groups
Ryoichi Sasakawa: a right-wing follower and ideology also linked with criminal societies
Okinori Kaya: nationalist and merchant related with some Yakuza groups

Military figures in politics

General Kazushige Ugaki: Prime Minister 
General Tanaka Giichi: Prime Minister
General Hideki Tōjō: Prime Minister, War Minister and Home Minister
General Sadao Araki: Radical ideologist, founder of Kodoha Party and Minister of Education
Admiral Makoto Saito: Prime Minister
Colonel Kingoro Hashimoto: Leader of Imperial Young Federation, Imperial Aid Association and Imperial Farmers Association 
Admiral Mitsumasa Yonai: Prime Minister
General Nobuyuki Abe: Foreign Affairs Minister
Lieutenant General Heisuke Yanagawa: Ministry of Justice and leader of the Imperial Aid Association
Admiral Teijirō Toyoda: Commerce & Industry and Foreign Affairs Minister
Lieutenant General Seizo Sakonji: Commerce & Industry Minister
General Kuniaki Koizo: Prime Minister and partidaire of State Shintoism policy
Admiral Kichisaburō Nomura: military policy, proposed how special ambassador in agreements with the United States
General Hachirō Arita: ex-Foreign Affairs Minister and military thinker
Colonel Hideo Iwakuro: member of Army Staaff, right-winger, and diplomatic Army supporter

References

Politics of the Empire of Japan